Benedikt Sibenhirter, O.S.B. (died 1458) was a Roman Catholic prelate who served as Auxiliary Bishop of Passau (1452–1458).

Sibenhirter was ordained a priest in the Order of Saint Benedict in 1428. On 20 Nov 1452, he was appointed during the papacy of Pope Nicholas V as Auxiliary Bishop of Passau  and Titular Bishop of Lydda. He served as Auxiliary Bishop of Passau until his death on 10 May 1458.

References 

15th-century Roman Catholic bishops in Bavaria
Bishops appointed by Pope Nicholas V
1458 deaths
Benedictine bishops